Harold Giles Hoffman (February 7, 1896 – June 4, 1954) was an American politician of the Republican Party who served as the 41st governor of New Jersey from 1935 to 1938. He also served two terms representing  in the United States House of Representatives, from 1927 to 1931.

Early life
Hoffman was born in South Amboy, New Jersey to Frank Hoffman and Ada Crawford Thom. Ada was the daughter of the painter James Crawford Thom and the granddaughter of Scottish sculptor James Thom. Hoffman also had two ancestors who were soldiers in the American Revolutionary War. His father's side of the family were among some of the early settlers in New Amsterdam, now known as New York City, but originated in Sweden; Hoffman's father's family were the descendants of Dutch nobility.

Hoffman attended public schools and graduated from South Amboy High School in 1913. He worked with a local newspaper until enlisting on July 25, 1917, as a private in the Third Regiment of the New Jersey Infantry. He served overseas in World War I as a captain and advanced to the rank of lieutenant colonel until he was discharged with the rank of colonel in 1946. After World War I, Hoffman returned to South Amboy and became an executive with the South Amboy Trust Company. He later became the bank's president, a position he held until 1942.

Political career

During his career, Hoffman served in a series of political offices, including city treasurer of South Amboy, New Jersey state assemblyman, mayor of South Amboy, and U.S. Congressman. In 1934, Hoffman was narrowly elected governor of New Jersey.

As governor, Hoffman secretly visited convicted Lindbergh kidnapper Bruno Hauptmann in his death row cell on the evening of October 16, 1935, with Anna Bading, a stenographer and fluent speaker of German. Hoffman urged the other members of the New Jersey Court of Errors and Appeals, then the state's highest court, to visit Hauptmann. Despite Governor Hoffman's doubt regarding Hauptmann's guilt, Hoffman was unable to convince the other members of the court to re-examine the case, and Hauptmann was executed on April 3, 1936.

Hoffman was a delegate to the 1936 Republican National Convention.

As governor, Hoffman got into at least two separate fistfights with reporters. Hoffman's advocacy of a state sales tax cost him the support of his own party.

In 1939, Hoffman was named president of the minor league baseball Interstate League.

Due to World War II, Hoffman was granted military leave as director of the Unemployment Compensation Commission on June 15, 1942. He reentered the army as a major in the Transportation Corps and served until June 24, 1946, when he was discharged with the rank of colonel. Upon discharge, Hoffman resumed his position as director of the Unemployment Commission.

In 1948, he appeared on the short-lived ABC network program That Reminds Me.

Hoffman displayed a willingness to appear on humorous panel games. On June 12, 1948, he was a guest panelist on the joke-themed radio program Stop Me If You've Heard This One. On February 2, 1950, Hoffman was one of four panelists on the debut presentation of the game show What's My Line?. On February 16, 1950, he made a return appearance. In 1953, Hoffman appeared as a panelist on the NBC radio joke-telling program Can You Top This?.

Death and confession
On March 18, 1954, Governor Robert B. Meyner uncovered a significant embezzlement scheme perpetrated by Hoffman and suspended him from his position of Unemployment Compensation Commission Director. Three months later, in June 1954, Hoffman died in a New York City hotel room of a heart attack.

Just before dying, the former governor wrote a confession and admitted that he had embezzled over $300,000 from the state. Hoffman is buried in Christ Church Cemetery in South Amboy, New Jersey.

See also

Adventurers' Club of New York
List of governors of New Jersey

References

External links

Biography of Harold G. Hoffman (PDF), New Jersey State Library
 New Jersey Governor Harold Giles Hoffman, National Governors Association
Article on Hoffman's corruption
Harold Giles Hoffman at The Political Graveyard

Dead Governors of New Jersey bio for Harold G. Hoffman

1896 births
1954 deaths
20th-century American politicians
United States Army personnel of World War I
United States Army personnel of World War II
Methodists from New Jersey
American people of Dutch descent
American people of English descent
American people of Scottish descent
American people of Swedish descent
Burials in New Jersey
Republican Party governors of New Jersey
Mayors of South Amboy, New Jersey
Military personnel from New Jersey
People from South Amboy, New Jersey
Republican Party members of the United States House of Representatives from New Jersey
United States Army colonels
Minor league baseball executives